Record City is a 1978 American comedy film starring Ed Begley Jr., Sorrell Booke, Michael Callan, Jack Carter, Frank Gorshin, Ruth Buzzi and Dennis Bowen.

Plot
The youth-oriented film chronicles the zany exploits of the employees at a record store.

Cast
Leonard Barr as Sickly Man
Ed Begley Jr. as Pokey
Sorrell Booke as Coznowski
Dennis Bowen as Danny
Ruth Buzzi as Olga
Michael Callan as Eddie
Jack Carter as Manny
Rick Dees as Gordon
Kinky Friedman as himself
Stuart Goetz as Rupert
Alice Ghostley as Worried Wife
Frank Gorshin as Chameleon
Maria Grimm as Rita
Joe Higgins as Doyle
Ted Lange as The Wiz
Alan Oppenheimer as Blind Man
Isaac Ruiz as Macho
Harold Sakata as Gucci
Wendy Schaal as Lorraine
Larry Storch as Deaf Man
Elliott Street as Hitch
John Halsey as Priest In The Fetus Brother
Tony Giorgio as Mr. F
Tim Thomerson as Marty
Susan Tolsky as Goldie
Jeff Altman as Engineer

External links

Record City at FilmAffinity
Record City at Rotten Tomatoes

References

1978 films
1978 comedy films
American comedy films
American International Pictures films
Films with screenplays by Ron Friedman
1970s English-language films
1970s American films